The Canada National Football Junior Team a.k.a. the Football Canada World Junior Team represent Canada in international gridiron football competitions.  The football program is part of the football development program and is controlled by Football Canada and is recognized by the International Federation of American Football (IFAF).   It is the premiere team in male development for the organization. While Football Canada is the governing body for amateur Canadian football, IFAF-sponsored games are played using American football rules.  Team Canada first competed on the world stage in the NFL Global Junior Championship in 2000 with a championship victory over Team Europe. They competed for their first IFAF Junior World Cup in 2009.

Canada developed the Football Canada World Junior Team as an elite program which participated in the International Federation of American Football (IFAF) Under-19 World Championship which was scheduled held every two years from 2012 until 2020.  This tournament was previously known as the IFAF Junior World Cup.

The IFAF U20 World Junior Championship will replace the U19 format and will be staged once every four years starting in 2024 in Edmonton, Canada. With the 2020 championship cancelled due to COVID-19, there are efforts to restage that event in 2021 as a U20 aged event.

History
Football Canada became a full member of the IFAF in 2004. Thereafter Canada competed in international junior, flag, and women's football events.

Team Canada is the most successful team at the IFAF World Junior Championships, with three championships and two silver medals. Canada is the only national team to win back-to-back championships in 2016 in Harbin, China over the United States, followed up with a 2018 win in Mexico, 13–7 over the host Mexicans in front of 30,515 at Mexico 68 Estadio Olympico. 

The roster of the Canada national football junior team is players aged 20 and under and are typically from U SPORTS, Canadian Junior Football League (CJFL), Quebec-based CEGEP schools, high school or community football programs.  The head coach for the program is selected by Football Canada and appointed prior to selecting the remainder of the tournaments coaching staff or players.

IFAF World Junior Championship Games

References

External links
 IFAF U19 World Championships Official Site
 Football Canada Official Site

 
National men's under-19 American football teams
National youth sports teams of Canada